R (Seymour-Smith) v Secretary of State for Employment [2000] UKHL 12 and (1999) C-167/97 is a landmark case in United Kingdom labour law and European labour law on the qualifying period of work before an employee accrues unfair dismissal rights. It was held by the House of Lords and the European Court of Justice that a two-year qualifying period had a disparate impact on women given that significantly fewer women worked long enough to be protected by the unfair dismissal law, but that the government could, at that point in the 1990s, succeed in an objective justification of increasing recruitment by employers.

Facts
Ms Nicole Seymour-Smith and Ms Perez had made a claim against the Secretary of State for Employment that the United Kingdom's qualifying period of two years for unfair dismissal constituted indirect discrimination against women under the Treaty of the European Union, article 119 (now TFEU art 157) and the Equal Treatment Directive 76/207/EEC. Ms Seymour-Smith was dismissed after less than a year's work in 1991 for Christo & Co, and Ms Perez had similarly claimed unfair dismissal after losing her job at Matthew Stone Restoration. Statistically fewer women had long enough periods of service as men to accrue the protection of unfair dismissal law, for data collected between 1985 and 1991 when Ms Seymour-Smith was working. (There was evidence that after that time the gap had been starting to narrow.) The UK qualifying period resulted from the Unfair Dismissal (Variation of Qualifying Period) Order 1985, which had raised the qualifying period for all employees from its original period of one year under the Employment Protection (Consolidation) Act 1978 section 64(1).

Elias QC represented the government and Allen QC represented the employees. Before the conclusion of the litigation, in 1999, the newly elected Labour government reduced the qualifying period for unfair dismissal from two years to one year, currently found in the Employment Rights Act 1996 section 108.

Judgment

Court of Appeal
The Court of Appeal held that under the Equal Treatment Directive, a two-year qualifying period for unfair dismissal was indirectly discriminatory, and the Secretary of State for Employment had failed to prove that there was an objective justification for the disparate impact. However, it was unclear that compensation for unfair dismissal was "pay" within the meaning of the Treaty of the European Community, article 119, and so it was unable to grant relief. The Secretary of State appealed.

House of Lords
Lord Hoffmann, giving judgment for the whole House, said that while it was clear that under the Directive, which had only "vertical direct effect" and could be enforceable only against the state, the Treaty article 119 had "horizontal direct effect" and thus created a right of enforcement between private parties. Nevertheless, as in the Court of Appeal it was unclear what the European position was on a number of points. Hence a reference was made to the European Court of Justice asking (1) whether unfair dismissal compensation was "pay" under article 119 (2) whether unfair dismissal fell within the scope of article 119 (3) what the legal test should be for establishing a disparate impact was (4) when a state's action is at issue which time is relevant between when a measure is adopted, brought into force or when an employee is dismissed, and (5) what are the criteria for objective justification?

European Court of Justice
The ECJ responded that unfair dismissal compensation did constitute pay under TEC article 119, and that unfair dismissal legislation therefore fell within the ambit of EU measures on discrimination. The test for disparate impact would be borne out by evidence, including statistics and the relevant time was whether a "lesser but persistent and relatively constant disparity" would exist. On the question of objective justification, the ECJ held the following.

House of Lords
The House of Lords held by a majority of three to two that the extension of the qualifying period in 1985 had had a considerable disparate impact on women. Lord Nicholls, Lord Goff and Lord Jauncey reached this conclusion in agreement with the Court of Appeal by comparing the number of women that did qualify for unfair dismissal protection the number who did not, and then assessing whether the disparity was significant. Lord Slynn and Lord Steyn dissented from this conclusion on the ground that it was for the national court to assess the effect and that on the facts the statistics were not significant enough.

However, the majority of their Lordships were agreed that there had been a sufficient objective justification by the government, namely encouraging recruitment by employers, to pass the 1985 Order. This resulted from the broad margin of discretion that governments had to implement social policy to achieve a legitimate aim. Yet it was emphasised that experience may change whether a measure is objectively justified. Lord Nicholls concluded in the following way.

Significance
Seymour-Smith tested the impact that legislation for equality had on other provisions of national law, and came to the conclusion that member states should have a broad discretion in the kinds of social policies they pursue, but that their reasoning process was subject to review by the European Court of Justice, as was the quality of evidence provided, and that in any event no social policy could contravene the principle of equal treatment. The House of Lords affirmed this in holding that while there may have been objective justification in 1991 still for a two-year qualifying period, experience of such measures could call for a different assessment at a later point in time, and a government would have to keep the issue under review.

See also

United Kingdom labour law

Notes

External links
Office for National Statistics, 'Duration of Employment by Sex and Age, 2003' (Social Trends 34) statistics.gov.uk
Matthew Stone Restoration's webpage, which allegedly unfairly dismissed Ms Perez
Christo & Co's webpage, which allegedly unfairly dismissed Ms Seymour-Smith

United Kingdom labour case law
House of Lords cases
Court of Justice of the European Union case law
2000 in case law
2000 in British law
European Union labour case law